This page lists the municipal flags of Chūgoku region, Japan. It is a part of the List of Japanese municipal flags, which is split into regions due to its size.

Complete lists of Japanese municipal flags pages

 List of municipal flags of Hokkaidō
 List of municipal flags of Tōhoku region
 List of municipal flags of Kantō region
 List of municipal flags of Chūbu region
 List of municipal flags of Kansai region
 List of municipal flags of Chūgoku region
 List of municipal flags of Shikoku
 List of municipal flags of Kyūshū

Tottori Prefecture

Cities

Towns and villages

Historical

Shimane Prefecture

Cities

Towns

Historical

Okayama Prefecture

Cities

Towns and villages

Historical

Hiroshima Prefecture

Cities

Towns

Historical

Yamaguchi Prefecture

Cities

Towns

See also
List of municipal flags of Hokkaidō
List of municipal flags of Tōhoku region
List of municipal flags of Kantō region
List of municipal flags of Chūbu region
List of municipal flags of Kansai region
List of municipal flags of Shikoku
List of municipal flags of Kyūshū

Municipal